Alhaji A. B. Sheriff is a Sierra Leonean politician. He is a member of the Sierra Leone People's Party and is one of the representatives in the Parliament of Sierra Leone for Koinadugu District, elected in 2002.

References

Members of the Parliament of Sierra Leone
Year of birth missing (living people)
Living people
Sierra Leone People's Party politicians
Place of birth missing (living people)
21st-century Sierra Leonean politicians